Bellevue Standpipe is a historic water storage tank on Bellevue Hill at Washington Street and West Roxbury Parkway in the Stony Brook Reservation of Boston, Massachusetts.  Built in 1914, it is one of three early 20th-century water tanks built as part of Greater Boston's public water supply.  The structure was added to the National Register of Historic Places in 1990.

Description and history
Bellevue Standpipe is located in Bellevue Hill Park, at the northern tip of the Stony Brook Reservation.

The standpipe was built by the Metropolitan Water and Sewerage Board (predecessor to today's MWRA) in 1914 as part of the Southern Extra High Service Area.  It replaced a smaller standpipe built in 1888. Its construction was overseen by Dexter Brackett, the water board's chief engineer, and the tank was provided by the Holyoke Steam Boiler Works; they also provided the tank for the Arlington Reservoir (Arlington, Massachusetts), built about the same time.

The standpipe received water from the Fisher Hill Reservoir in Brookline via a  main, delivered via a pumping station in Hyde Park.  A second water storage tank was added at this location in 1955-56.  The older tank is currently operated as a standby to the newer one.

See also
Arlington Reservoir (Arlington, Massachusetts)
Chestnut Hill Reservoir Historic District
Forbes Hill Standpipe
National Register of Historic Places listings in southern Boston, Massachusetts

References

Infrastructure completed in 1914
Industrial buildings and structures on the National Register of Historic Places in Massachusetts
Industrial buildings and structures in Boston
Water supply infrastructure on the National Register of Historic Places
National Register of Historic Places in Boston